Jean-Jacques Behm (born 4 May 1942) is a French hurdler. He competed in the men's 400 metres hurdles at the 1964 Summer Olympics.

References

External links
 

1942 births
Living people
Athletes (track and field) at the 1964 Summer Olympics
French male hurdlers
Olympic athletes of France
Place of birth missing (living people)
20th-century French people
21st-century French people